The OM646 is a turbocharged inline-four engine produced between 2002 and 2010 by Mercedes-Benz.

Design 
The OM646 engine is sold under the 200 CDI and 220 CDI designation and features an electric fuel pump, exhaust gas recirculation, particulate filters, and Euro 4 emission standard compliance (from 2003). In 2006, the engine was updated under the EVO name and replaced the OM647 and OM648 engines. It features a reduced compression ratio of 17.5:1, a new turbocharger, and ceramic glow plugs for improved engine starts.

Models

OM646 DE22 LA R 
 2003–2006 W211 E200 CDI
 2003–2007 W203 C200 CDI
 2003–2010 W639 Vito 109 CDI, 111 CDI, 2.0 CDI
 2008–2010 CL203 CLC200 CDI
2003-2009 Chrysler PT Cruiser

OM646 DE22 LA 
 2002–2006 W211 E220 CDI
 2004–2007 W203 C220 CDI
 2003–2010 W639 Vito 115 CDI, 2.2 CDI
 2005–2010 C209 CLK220 CDI
 2006–2009 W906 Sprinter 209-516 CDI
 2008–2010 CL203 CLC220 CDI
 2010–2013 Vito (Chinese market; known as OM646 980)
 2003–2009 Chrysler PT Cruiser

OM646 DE 22 LA EVO R 
 2006–2009 W211 E200 CDI
 2007–2009 W204 C200 CDI

OM646 DE 22 LA EVO 
 2006–2009 W211 E220 CDI
 2007–2009 W204 C220 CDI

References 

OM646
Diesel engines by model
Straight-four engines